Colin Campbell (21 January 1817 – 28 November 1903) was a pastoralist and politician in colonial Victoria, a member of the Victorian Legislative Council, and later, the Victorian Legislative Assembly.

Early life
Campbell was born in Glasgow, Scotland, the sixth son of Alexander Campbell, a merchant, and Barbara, née Campbell. He was educated at the Edinburgh Academy from 1825 to 1832 and then entered Exeter College, Oxford, gaining a B.A. in 1838.

Colonial Australia
Campbell and his brother Alexander arrived in the Port Phillip District via Hobart in 1839. When Victoria became a separate colony in 1851, Campbell refused a nomination to the Victorian Legislative Council and became a school inspector. On 10 May 1854 Campbell was elected to the unicameral Victorian Legislative Council for Ripon, Hampden, Grenville and Polwarth. Campbell held this position until the original Council was abolished in March 1856. He then represented the Polwarth, Ripon, Hampden, South Grenville in the inaugural Victorian Legislative Assembly from November 1856 to August 1859. Then after unsuccessfully contesting the Assembly seats of Ararat in 1864, South Grant in 1867 and Crowlands in 1868 & 1871, he was elected for Crowlands in May 1874 and held the seat until it was abolished in April 1877.

Campbell died in Hawthorn, Victoria on 28 November 1903. He had married twice: to Frances Elliott Macwhirter (died 1883) on 15 January 1851; and to Emily Ashby Shieffield in 1885 at Brighton.

References

 

 

1817 births
1903 deaths
People educated at Edinburgh Academy
Alumni of Exeter College, Oxford
Members of the Victorian Legislative Council
Members of the Victorian Legislative Assembly
Politicians from Glasgow
Australian pastoralists
Scottish emigrants to colonial Australia
19th-century Australian politicians
19th-century Australian businesspeople